The reddish scops owl (Otus rufescens) is an owl found in southeast Asia.

References

BirdLife Species Factsheet
ITIS Report

reddish scops owl
Birds of Malesia
reddish scops owl